Mukundapur  is a town in Gaidakot Municipality in eastern part of Nawalparasi District in the Lumbini Zone of southern Nepal. It became a municipality in May 2014 by merging the existing Mukundapur, Amarapuri, Gaidakot, Nawalparasi, VDCs. At the time of the 1991 Nepal census it had a population of 7631. According to the 2011 Nepal census, the VDC had a population of 13,027 (Male:6,254 and Female:6,773) living in 3,023 houses. The VDC is historically important as the "Mukundasen Palace" built by King Madimukundasen of Palpa lies here. The VDC is named after this Palace.

Villages
 

Sikhrauli

References

Populated places in Nawalpur District